Tomaso Tommasi di Vignano is an Italian business executive, currently Chairman of Hera Group.

Born in Brescia in 1947, he obtained a degree in law before beginning his career at SIP (Società Idroelettrica Piemontese SpA) in the Personnel Department. In 1989 he assumed the position of Personnel Director for the SIP Group.  From December 1992 to May 1994 as CEO of Iritel SpA he undertook to transform the old state company into a new company which subsequently merged with Telecom Italia.

From 1994 to 1997 Di Vignano was general manager of Telecom Italia, responsible for the International, Business Customer and Residential Customer Divisions. In 1997, as CEO of  STET - Società Finanziaria Telefonica, he successfully completed the merge of the company with Telecom Italia.

In 1997 he was appointed CEO of Telecom Italia and guided the process of complete privatization of the Group.

From 1999 to 2002 he held the post of Managing Director of the multiutility ACEGAS SpA in Trieste, and managed the process of privatization of that company, up through its placement on the stock market.

Since November 2002 Di Vignano has been CEO of Hera Group, where he managed the process of placing the company on the stock exchange, which took place in June 2003. Married with two children, he currently lives in Rome.

External links 
 HG biography

Italian businesspeople
People from Brescia
Living people
1947 births